The Chandler-Hidden House is a historic house in Andover, Massachusetts.  It was built for Isaac Chandler, probably by his son-in-law David Hidden, in about 1812.  Hidden, a housewright, had come to Andover to help in the construction of the Andover Theological Seminary.  He married Chandler's daughter in 1816, bought half the house in 1828, and the rest after Chandler's death in 1834.  The house passed out of the Hidden family in 1897.  It is a -story Federal style colonial, with five window bays and two side chimneys.  The centered front door is protected by a protruding portico, and there is a rear ell that appears to be original to the house.

The house was listed on the National Register of Historic Places in 1982.

See also
National Register of Historic Places listings in Andover, Massachusetts
National Register of Historic Places listings in Essex County, Massachusetts

References

Houses in Andover, Massachusetts
National Register of Historic Places in Andover, Massachusetts
Houses on the National Register of Historic Places in Essex County, Massachusetts
Federal architecture in Massachusetts